Asan Salidzharovich Khaliev (born 1915 – died no earlier than 1985) was a decorated Crimean Tatar sniper in the Soviet marines with over 240 kills, making him the top sniper from Crimea. A participant in the battles for Sevastopol, the Caucasus, Odessa, Kuban, and Novorossiysk among others, he was nominated for the title of Hero of the Soviet Union in 1943 for his success as a sniper (by then his tally was at 242 kills), however he was only awarded the Order of the Red Banner instead. Later that year he was severely wounded in combat, resulting in him being sent to a hospital away from the warfront. Little is known about his life after being demobilized other than that he received the Order of the Patriotic War jubilee medal as a veteran in honor of the 40th anniversary of victory in 1985.

Footnotes

References 

1915 births
Recipients of the Order of the Red Banner
Recipients of the Order of the Red Star
People nominated for the title Hero of the Soviet Union
Crimean Tatar people
Soviet military snipers
Soviet military personnel of World War II
People from Taurida Governorate
Year of death unknown